México Pelágico is a 2014 Mexican documentary film. It was written by Jerónimo Prieto, who also directed it. It portrays the life of the open ocean of Mexico through the eyes of young conservationists.

It received the Director's Award at the 12th San Francisco International Ocean Film Festival in early 2015, and an audience award for "Best Environmental Film" at the 2015 Vail Film Festival.

References

External links
 
 

Mexican documentary films
Documentary films about water and the environment
2014 films
2010s Spanish-language films
2010s English-language films
2010s Mexican films